Nature Biotechnology is a monthly peer-reviewed scientific journal published by Nature Portfolio. The editor-in-chief is Barbara Cheifet who heads an in-house team of editors. The focus of the journal is biotechnology including research results and the commercial business sector of this field. Coverage includes the related biological, biomedical, agricultural and environmental sciences. Also of interest are the commercial, political, legal, and societal influences that affect this field.

The journal continues serial publication of the title "Bio/Technology", which had a publication period of 1983 to 1996.

Abstracting and indexing 

This journal is indexed in 

 BIOBASE
 BIOSIS
 Chemical Abstracts Service
 CSA Illumina
 CAB Abstracts
 EMBASE
 Scopus
 Current Contents
 Science Citation Index
 Medline (PubMed)

According to the Journal Citation Reports, the journal has a 2021 impact factor of 68.164, ranking it 2nd out of 158 journals in the category "Biotechnology & Applied Microbiology".

References

External links 

 Official website

Nature Research academic journals
Biotechnology journals
Publications established in 1983
Monthly journals
1983 in biotechnology